The 2015 NCAA Division I FCS football season, part of college football in the United States, was organized by the National Collegiate Athletic Association (NCAA) at the Division I Football Championship Subdivision (FCS) level. The season began on August 29, 2015, and concluded with the 2016 NCAA Division I Football Championship Game played on January 9, 2016, at Toyota Stadium in Frisco, Texas.

Conference changes and new programs

One team left the FCS to transition to FBS while two schools added football at the FCS level, all moves officially taking effect on July 1, 2015.

Updated stadiums
No FCS schools opened new stadiums for the 2015 season, however two new programs debuted in the season:
East Tennessee State plays at Kermit Tipton Stadium located on the campus of Science Hill High School in Johnson City, Tennessee.
Kennesaw State plays on campus at Fifth Third Bank Stadium, which has a capacity of 8,318.  There are plans to expand the capacity to over 10,000.

FCS team wins over FBS teams
(FCS rankings from the STATS poll)

September 4:
 No. 20 Fordham 37, Army 35
September 5:
 North Dakota 24, Wyoming 13
 Portland State 24, Washington St 17
 No. 16 South Dakota State 41, Kansas 38
September 19:
 Furman 16, UCF 15
September 26:
 No. 9 James Madison 48, SMU 45
October 3:
 No. 18 Liberty 41, Georgia State 33
October 10:
 No. 25 Portland State 66, North Texas 7
This game saw the largest victory margin ever by an FCS team over an FBS team, surpassing Lehigh's 58–0 win over Harvard in 1981, the year before Harvard and the rest of the Ivy League moved from FBS to FCS (then Divisions I-A and I-AA respectively). Portland State also became the first FCS team to defeat two FBS teams in the same season since North Dakota State in 2007. North Texas' head coach, Dan McCarney, was fired later in the day.
November 21:
 No. 25 The Citadel 23, South Carolina 22

Conference standings

Conference summaries

Championship games

Other conference winners
Note: Records are regular-season only, and do not include playoff games.

Playoff qualifiers

Automatic berths for conference champions

At large qualifiers

Abstentions
Ivy League – Dartmouth, Harvard, Penn
Mid-Eastern Athletic Conference – North Carolina A&T
Southwestern Athletic Conference – Alcorn State

Postseason

NCAA Division I playoff bracket

* Home team    † Overtime    Winner

Bowl Games

Coaching changes

Preseason and in-season
This is restricted to coaching changes that took place on or after May 1, 2015. For coaching changes that occurred earlier in 2015, see 2014 NCAA Division I FCS end-of-season coaching changes.

End of season

See also
2015 NCAA Division I FCS football rankings
2015 NCAA Division I FBS football season
2015 NCAA Division II football season
2015 NCAA Division III football season

References